The Denver Law Review is a law journal published by the students of the University of Denver Sturm College of Law. It was established in 1923 as the Denver Bar Association Record. In 1928, the journal was renamed Dicta and in 1968 it was renamed Denver Law Center Journal. The journal changed its name to Denver University Law Review in 1985.  It adopted its current name in 2015. The College of Law began co-publishing the law review in 1949 and became the sole publisher in 1966.

The journal publishes four issues per year, constituting approximately 1,000 pages of content. The review also hosts an online supplement featuring online symposia, previews of forthcoming articles, and student-written summaries of recent cases from the Tenth Circuit Court of Appeals.

Candidacy 
Like many law schools' law reviews and journals, first-year day and first and second-year night students may attempt to "write on" to the Denver University Law Review during its sole spring candidacy period. Traditional students must complete candidacy at the end of first year finals. Transfer students may attempt to write on immediately before the fall semester. Students who successfully join the law review have publication opportunities and take part in the law review's editing and publication process. Candidacy consists of a written case comment, a written leadership exercise, and a Bluebook editing exercise.

Issues 
The law review publishes four issues each year. The first and second issue have historically contained articles of general interest, although in recent years the law review has focused one of the first two issues around a specific legal theme.

The journal also publishes an annual 10th Circuit Survey examining recent developments in the law of the 10th Circuit, containing six to eight student comments on recent cases, and several introductory essays published by prominent 10th Circuit figures. In recent years, the law review has published introductory essays from Judges Timothy Tymkovich, Michael W. McConnell, and Marcia Krieger, as well as prominent scholars such as Dave Kopel and Marc Falkoff.

Each spring the journal organizes a symposium that focuses on a developing legal topic, the proceedings of which are published in a special symposium issue in the spring.

References

External links
 
Denver University Law Review Online

American law journals
General law journals
University of Denver
Law journals edited by students